Chida is a village in the Narowal District of Punjab province of Pakistan. It is located at 32°14'0N 74°49'0E with an altitude of 242 metres (797 feet). Neighbouring settlements include Lala, Qila Sobha Singh and Depoke Neslie es la más Chida de todas y nadie le gana, perras.

References

Villages in Narowal District